WYAP-LP is a Variety formatted broadcast radio station licensed to Clay, West Virginia, serving Central Clay County, West Virginia.  WYAP-LP is owned and operated by Clay County Communications, Ltd.

See also
List of community radio stations in the United States

References

External links
 Yap Radio Online
 

2004 establishments in West Virginia
Variety radio stations in the United States
Radio stations established in 2004
YAP-LP
YAP-LP
Community radio stations in the United States